Churmaq or Chowrmaq may refer to:
 Churmaq, Kabudarahang
 Churmaq, Razan